Strategic sealift ships are part of the United States Military Sealift Command's (MSC) prepositioning program. There are currently 17 ships in the program, strategically positioned around the world to support the Army, Navy, Air Force, Marine Corps and Defense Logistics Agency. Most are named after Medal of Honor recipients from the service they support. The ships are assigned to two Military Prepositioning Ship (MPS) squadrons located in the Indian Ocean at Diego Garcia and in the Western Pacific Ocean at Guam and Saipan. 

The MPS ships in each squadron have sufficient equipment, supplies and ammunition to support a Marine Air-Ground Task Force for 30 days. The MPS ships are self-sustaining, with cranes to unload at sea or pierside. MSC chartered the first two ship classes in the MPS role (the Corporal Louis J. Hauge Jr. and Sergeant Matej Kocak classes) from civilian shipping lines and converted them. Later ships were purpose-built.

Ships

Sergeant Matej Kocak class

The Sergeant Matej Kocak class, the second class of MPS ships chartered by MSC, also gained  amidships and a helicopter deck after conversion. These ships, delivered to MSC in the mid-1980s, built at Sun Shipbuilding & Drydock Co., Chester, Pennsylvania, and converted at National Steel and Shipbuilding Company, San Diego.  They were previously owned by Waterman Steamship Corporation but recently sold to MSC and now operated by Keystone Shipping Company. They were all part of the Waterman Line C7-S-133a Series.
 Builder: Sun Shipbuilding & Drydock Co., Chester, PA; General Dynamics Quincy Shipbuilding Division, Quincy, Massachusetts
 Converted:  National Steel and Shipbuilding Company, San Diego, California
 Power Plant: 2 boilers; 2 GE turbines; ; 1 shaft
 Length: 
 Beam: 
 Displacement: 48,754 tons (49,536 metric tons) full load
 Cargo capacity: Containers, 532; ro-ro, ; JP-5 barrels, 20,290; DF-2 barrels, 12,355; Mogas barrels, 3,717; stable water, 2,189; cranes, two twin 50-ton and one 30-ton gantry
 Helicopters: platform only
 Speed: 
 Ships:
  (formerly SS Sgt. Matej Kocak, SS John B. Waterman)
  (formerly SS PFC Eugene A. Obregon, SS Thomas Heywood)
  (formerly SS Maj. Stephen W. Pless, SS Charles Carroll)
 Crew: 34 civilians, 10 technicians

2nd Lieutenant John P. Bobo class
The 2nd Lieutenant John P. Bobo-class ships are new construction ships delivered to MSC in the mid-1980s from General Dynamics Quincy Shipbuilding Division, Quincy, Massachusetts They were owned by American Overseas Marine (AMSEA) but have been recently sold to MSC and are now operated by Crowley Technical Management.
 Builders: General Dynamics Quincy Shipbuilding Division, Quincy, Massachusetts
 Power Plant: 2 Stork-Werkspoor 16TM410 diesels;  sustained; 1 Omnithruster JT1000 bow thruster, 
 Length: 
 Beam: 
 Displacement: 44,330 tons (45,041 metric tons) full load
 Cargo capacity: Containers, 530; ro-ro, ; JP-5 barrels, 20,776; DF-2 barrels, 13,334; Mogas barrels, 4,880; stable water, 2,357; cranes, one single and two twin 39-ton
 Helicopters: platform only
 Speed: 
 Ships:
  (formerly MV 2nd Lt. John P. Bobo)
  (formerly MV PFC Dewayne T. Williams)
  (formerly MV 1st Lt. Baldomero Lopez)
  (formerly MV 1st Lt. Jack Lummus)
  (formerly MV Sgt. William R. Button)
 Crew: 38 civilians, 10 technicians

Capt Steven L. Bennett class
 Length:  
 Beam:  
 Draft:  
 Displacement:  
 Speed:  
 Civilian:  24 contract mariners

SSG Edward A. Carter Jr. class

 Length:  
 Beam:  
 Draft:  
 Displacement:  
 Speed:  
 Civilian:  22 contract mariners

Buffalo Soldier class
 Length:  
 Beam:  
 Draft:  
 Displacement:  
 Speed:  
 Civilian:  21 contract mariners

Maj. Bernard F. Fisher class
 Length:  
 Beam:  
 Draft:  
 Displacement: 
 Speed:  
 Civilian:  24 contract mariners

1st Lt. Harry L. Martin class
 Length:  
 Beam:  
 Draft:  
 Displacement:  
 Speed:  
 Civilian:  25 contract mariners

LCPL Roy M. Wheat class
 Length: 
 Beam:  
 Draft:  
 Displacement:  
 Speed: 
 Civilian:  29 contract mariners

LTC John U. D. Page class
 Length:  
 Beam:  
 Draft:  
 Displacement:  
 Speed:  
 Civilian:  20 contract mariners

High-speed vessels

HSV 2 class
 Length:  
 Beam:  
 Draft:  
 Displacement: 
 Speed:  
 Civilian:  17 contract mariners
 Military:  as required by mission

Large, medium-speed roll-on/roll-off ships

Watson class
The  of LMSR built at National Steel and Shipbuilding Company in San Diego
 Length:  
 Beam:  
 Draft:  
 Displacement:  
 Power Plant: 2 GE Marine LM 2500 gas turbines; ; 2 shafts, cp props
 Speed:  
 Civilian:  30 contract mariners
 Military:  5

Tankers
 Length:  
 Beam:  
 Draft:  
 Displacement:  
 Speed:  
 Civilian:  24 contract mariners

Offshore petroleum distribution system
 Length:  
 Beam:  
 Draft:  
 Displacement:
 Speed:  
 Civilian:  26 contract mariners

Activated Ready Reserve Force ships
The following are part of the National Defense Reserve Fleet but have been activated and are pre-positioned.

Modular cargo delivery system ship
 Length:  
 Beam:  
 Draft:  
 Displacement:  
 Speed:  
 Civilian:  38 contract mariners

Wright class
Dedicated to USMC aviation logistics support
 Length:  
 Beam:  
 Draft:  
 Displacement:  
 Speed:  
 Civilian:  41 contract mariners

Former ships

Corporal Louis J. Hauge Jr. class

Named for Medal of Honor recipient Louis J. Hauge Jr. USMC, the Corporal Louis J. Hauge Jr. class is the original class of MPS ships chartered by Military Sealift Command. The five ships are Maersk Line ships converted by Bethlehem Steel. During conversion, the ships gained an additional  amidships and a helicopter landing pad, among other things. They have since been returned to Maersk for commercial use and are no longer part of the MPS program.
 Builder: Odense Staalskibsvaerft A/S, Lindo
 Power Plant: 1 Sulzer 7RND76M diesel; ; 1 shaft; bow thruster
 Length: 
 Beam: 
 Displacement:  full load
 Speed: 
 Ships:
 MV Cpl. Louis J. Hauge Jr. (T-AK 3000) (formerly MV Estelle Maersk)
  (formerly MV Eleo Maersk)
  (formerly MV Emma Maersk)
  (formerly MV Emilie Maersk)
  (formerly Pvt. Harry Fisher, MV Evelyn Maersk)
 Crew: 32 civilians, 10 technicians

See also

Further reading
'The Maritime Prepositioning Force and the U.S. Marines,' Asia-Pacific Defense Forum, Spring 1999

References

Ship types
United States Navy
Auxiliary ships of the United States Navy